This is a list of Estonian scientists.

Astronomers and space scientists 
Jaan Einasto (born 1929), astrophysicist
Ernst Öpik (1893–1985), astronomer and astrophysicist
Alar Toomre (born 1937), astronomer

Biologists, botanists and ecologists 
Jaan Eilart (1933–2006), phytogeographer, landscape ecologist, cultural historian and conservationist
Toomas Frey (born 1937), ecologist, geobotanist and forest scientist
Fred Jüssi (born 1935), biologist
Toomas Kukk (born 1971), botanist
Ülle Kukk (born 1937), botanist and conservationist
Kalevi Kull (born 1952), biologist and semiotician
Olevi Kull (1955–2007), ecologist
Tiiu Kull (born 1958), botanist
Eerik Kumari (1912–1984), biologist
Liivia Laasimer (1918–1988), botanist
Teodor Lippmaa (1892–1943), botanist
Aime Mäemets (1930–1996), botanist and hydrobiologist
Ann Marvet (born 1939), botanist 
Viktor Masing (1925–2001), botanist and ecologist
Ingmar Ott (born 1955), botanist 
Erast Parmasto (1928–2012), mycologist, bioscientist and botanist
Kaljo Pork (1930–1981), botanist
Jaan Port (1891–1950), botanist
Haide-Ene Rebassoo (born 1935), botanist
Bernhard Saarsoo (1899–1964), botanist
Andres Salumets (born 1971), biologist, biochemist and educator
Urmas Tartes (born 1963), biologist 
Hans Trass (1928–2017), ecologist and botanist
Aleksei Turovski (born 1946), zoologist and ethologist
Albert Üksip (1886–1966), botanist and actor
August Vaga (1893–1960), botanist 
Gustav Vilbaste (1885–1967), botanist
Olev Vinn (born 1971), paleobiologist and paleontologist
Martin Zobel (born 1957), ecologist

Chemists and material scientists 
Paul Kogerman (1891–1951), chemist
Jüri Kukk (1940–1981), chemist
Miia Rannikmäe (born 1951), chemist
Hillar Rootare (1928–2008), chemist
Ivar Karl Ugi (1930–2005), chemist
Lauri Vaska (1925–2015), chemist

Economists 
Ardo Hansson (born 1958), economist
Ragnar Nurkse (1907–1959), economist
Raul Renter (1920–1992), economist

Geneticists 
Toomas Kivisild (born 1969), geneticist
Andres Metspalu (born 1951), geneticist
Riin Tamm (born 1981), geneticist

Historians and art historians 

Vello Helk (1923–2014), historian
Magnus Ilmjärv (born 1961), historian
Richard Indreko (1900–1961), historian and archaeologist
Andres Kasekamp (born 1961), historian
Mart Laar (born 1960), historian
Villem Raam (1910–1996), art historian, art critic and conservator-restorer

Linguists and ethnographers 
Johannes Aavik (1880–1973), philologist
Paul Ariste (1905–1990), linguist
Oskar Kallas (1868–1946), linguist, folklorist and diplomat
Elmar Muuk (1901–1941), linguist
Jaan Puhvel (born 1932), linguist
Paul Saagpakk (1910–1996), linguist
Evar Saar (born 1969), linguist, toponymist and journalist

Mathematicians and computer scientists 
Gunnar Kangro (1913–1975), mathematician
Edgar Krahn (1894–1961), mathematician
Leiki Loone (born 1944), mathematician
Andres Luure (born 1959), philosopher and mathematician
Jaan Sarv (1877–1954), mathematician
Alar Toomre (born 1937), astronomer and mathematician

Psychologists 
Jüri Allik (born 1949), psychologist
Mart Murdvee (born 1951), psychologist and scholar
Konstantin Ramul (1879–1975), psychologist
Mare Teichmann (born 1954), psychologist
Endel Tulving (born 1927), psychologist and cognitive neuroscientist

Physicists 
Jaak Aaviksoo (born 1954), physicist and politician 
Endel Aruja (1911–2008), physicist
Vladimir Hütt (1936–1997), physicist
Harald Keres (1912–2010), physicist
Madis Kõiv (1929–2014), physicist, writer and philosopher
Gustav Naan (1919–1994), physicist and philosopher
Karl Rebane (1926–2007), physicist
Ljubov Rebane (1929–1991), physicist
Kaido Reivelt (born 1970), physicist

Other scientists 
Endel Laas (1915–2009), forest scientist
Endel Lippmaa (1930–2015), academian, politician, founder and chairman of the Science Council of the National Institute of Chemical Physics and Biophysics, chairman and professor of chemical physics, physical chemistry, physics, and mathematics 
Karl Leichter (1902–1987), musicologist

See also

 List of Estonian people
 Lists of scientists

Estonian
Scientists